Joshua Adams (born April 13), professionally known as J Beatzz, is an American Grammy Award nominated, platinum selling, hip hop record producer.

Early life 
Joshua Adams was born in Hartford, Connecticut, United States, and raised in New London, Connecticut. In 2006, he graduated from Full Sail University where he studied audio engineering. After graduation, he moved to Atlanta, Georgia, where he began working with Big Boi of Outkast at Stankonia Studios.

Career 
In 2010, J Beatzz received his first placement contributing to Big Boi of Outkast solo hit album, Sir Luscious Left Foot, producing the record "General Patton". The record was featured and revamped during the NFL Playoffs in 2011. J Beatzz contributed to Travis Scott third studio album Astroworld producing "Stop Trying To Be God". Astroworld was nominated for Best Rap Album at the 2019 Grammy Awards. Astroworld is certified 4 times Platinum by the Recording Industry Association of America (RIAA). ref name="auto1"></ref>
In 2018, he produced the tracks "Coco Chanel" and "Inspirations Outro" both featured on Nicki Minaj fourth studio album Queen. The record "CoCo Chanel" featured Foxy Brown. On January 11, 2019 the Recording Industry Association of America (RIAA) announced the Queen as certified platinum.

Awards and nominations

References

Record producers from Connecticut
American audio engineers
Year of birth missing (living people)
Living people
Full Sail University alumni
Musicians from Hartford, Connecticut